Frobenius is a surname. Notable people with the surname include:

 Ferdinand Georg Frobenius (1849–1917), mathematician
 Frobenius algebra
 Frobenius endomorphism
 Frobenius inner product
 Frobenius norm
 Frobenius method
 Frobenius group
 Frobenius theorem (differential topology)
 Georg Ludwig Frobenius (1566–1645), German publisher
 Johannes Frobenius (1460–1527), publisher and printer in Basel
 Hieronymus Frobenius (1501–1563), publisher and printer in Basel, son of Johannes
 Ambrosius Frobenius (1537–1602), publisher and printer in Basel, son of Hieronymus
 Leo Frobenius (1873–1938), ethnographer
 Nikolaj Frobenius (born 1965), Norwegian writer and screenwriter
 August Sigmund Frobenius (died 1741), German chemist

See also
 Frobenius Orgelbyggeri, Danish organ building firm